Fethard was a constituency in County Wexford represented in the Irish House of Commons until its abolition on 1 January 1801.

History
In the Patriot Parliament of 1689 summoned by James II, Fethard was represented with two members.

Members of Parliament, 1613–1801

1613–1615 Nicholas Loftus of Fethard and Richard Pemberton
1634–1635 Nicholas Loftus of Kildogan and Richard Parsons
1639–1649 Hugh Rochford (expelled) and Nicholas Stafford of Balmakatheryn (expelled)
1661–1666 Nicholas Loftus and Sir Nicholas Loftus

1689–1801

Notes

References

Bibliography

Constituencies of the Parliament of Ireland (pre-1801)
Historic constituencies in County Wexford
1613 establishments in Ireland
1800 disestablishments in Ireland
Constituencies established in 1613
Constituencies disestablished in 1800